Kevan Brent Guy (born July 16, 1965) is a Canadian former professional ice hockey player who played in the National Hockey League for the Calgary Flames and the Vancouver Canucks. He also played several years in the minor International Hockey League.

Playing career
A steady stay-at-home defender, Guy played his junior hockey with the Medicine Hat Tigers and was selected 71st overall by the Flames in the 1983 NHL Entry Draft. He signed with the Flames and turned pro in 1985, and made his NHL debut in the 1986–87 appearing in 24 games and recording 4 assists.

After another season split between Calgary and the minors, Guy was dealt to the Vancouver Canucks for the 1988–89 season. He spent his first full season in the NHL, appearing in 45 games for the Canucks and recording his first two career goals along with two assists. He spent two more seasons as a depth defender for the Canucks before being dealt back to Calgary near the end of the 1990–91 campaign.

Guy spent most of the next three seasons with the Salt Lake Golden Eagles, Calgary's minor-pro affiliate, appearing in just 3 games for the Flames in 1991–92. He also had a brief stint in Austria before retiring in 1995.

He appeared in a total 156 NHL games, scoring 5 goals and 20 assists for 25 points.  He also played 5 playoff games, four with the Flames and one with the Canucks, scoring one assist.

Post-playing career
Following his career, Guy remained in Salt Lake, where he had spent much of his minor-league career, and became an electrician. He also served for a time on the coaching staff of Brigham Young University's hockey team. Guy is currently part of the coaching staff for the Utah Valley University men's ice hockey team.

Guy is married to Amee and now have 5 children. Emalee, Andee, Conlee, Jaydee, and Bohdee.

Career statistics

Regular season and playoffs

References

External links

1965 births
Living people
Brigham Young University staff
Calgary Flames draft picks
Calgary Flames players
Canadian expatriate ice hockey players in the United States
Canadian ice hockey defencemen
EC Graz players
Denver Grizzlies players
Medicine Hat Tigers players
Milwaukee Admirals (IHL) players
Moncton Golden Flames players
Salt Lake Golden Eagles (IHL) players
Ice hockey people from Edmonton
Tallahassee Tiger Sharks players
Vancouver Canucks players